The 2007–08 Chicago Blackhawks season was the 82nd season for the National Hockey League franchise that was established on September 25, 1926. It began on October 4, 2007, against the Minnesota Wild. The 2007 season also marked the team's first winning season in six years.

Key dates prior to the start of the season:

The 2007 NHL Entry Draft took place in Columbus, Ohio, on June 22–23.  The Blackhawks had the first overall selection – using it to select Patrick Kane of the London Knights.
The free agency period began on July 1.
Captain Adrian Aucoin is traded to the Calgary Flames.

Regular season

On Saturday, November 17, 2007, the Blackhawks scored three short-handed goals in a 5–3 win over the Detroit Red Wings.

Divisional standings

Conference standings

Schedule and results

Playoffs
Chicago failed to qualify for the playoffs for the 5th consecutive season.

Player statistics

Skaters
Note: GP = Games played; G = Goals; A = Assists; Pts = Points; PIM = Penalty minutes

Goaltenders
Note: GP = Games played; TOI = Time on ice (minutes); W = Wins; L = Losses; OT = Overtime/shootout losses; GA = Goals against; SO = Shutouts; SV% = Save percentage; GAA = Goals against average

Awards and records

Records

Milestones

Transactions
The Blackhawks have been involved in the following transactions during the 2007–08 season.

Trades

Free agents

Draft picks
Chicago's picks at the 2007 NHL Entry Draft in Columbus, Ohio.  The Blackhawks had the first overall pick in the draft.

Farm teams

Rockford IceHogs
The Rockford IceHogs, who will be moving up from the United Hockey League, are the new American Hockey League affiliate of the Blackhawks in 2007–08.

Toledo Walleye
The Toledo Walleye are the Blackhawks affiliate in the ECHL.

See also
2007–08 NHL season

References

Player stats: Chicago Blackhawks player stats on espn.com
Game log: Chicago Blackhawks game log on espn.com
Team standings: NHL standings on espn.com

Chicago Blackhawks seasons
Chicago Blackhawks season, 2007-08
Chicago
Chic
Chic